Javad Khan Shirvanski was an Azerbaijani noble and Imperial Russian general.

Life 
He was born in 1809 in Shamakhi. He was fourth son of Mustafa Khan of Shirvan. He was brought up and educated in family palace in Shamakhi. His mother was a Georgian woman called Gulandam khanum, a woman of untold beauty according to Adolf Berge.

Military career 
He was sent to Shirvan cavalry detachment to participate in another expedition against the mountaineers in July 1832. He was awarded Golden Weapon "For Bravery" by Georg Andreas von Rosen on 28 March 1833. He was admitted to be cornet of Imperial Guards of Russia on 6 April 1834, being first Azerbaijani ever to serve in Imperial Guards. Later he was transferred to Hussar regiment of Imperial Guards.

After serving in various posts, he was promoted to be a colonel on 6 December 1855. He was present in the coronation ceremony of Alexander II, representing Shamakhi Governorate as he was subsequently awarded Order of Saint Anne. He participated in Russo-Turkish war of 1877 and was awarded for his activities on 8 November 1877. He retired in 1882 as a major-general of the Russian army.

Personal life 
He was descended from khans of Shirvan, by the virtue of being a son of the last Khan of Shirvan, he had various estates in Shirvan and Mughan. His main source of income was Khaki canal in Mughan according to a report made by Armenian agronomist S.A.Melik-Sarkisyan. He helped to fund charity organization set up by Hasan bey Zardabi in 1871.

Family 
He was married to Gawhar begüm (a daughter of Husein beg, his second cousin) in 1849 and had following issues:

 Bala Khan Shirvanski (b. 1852) - also a cornet in Imperial Guards. 
 Amir khan Shirvanski (b. 1854)
 Rashid khan Shirvanski (b. 1857)
 Sitara begüm (b. 1860)

Awards 

 Golden Weapon "For Bravery" (1833)
 Order of Saint Anne (3rd rank - 1837, 2nd rank - 1857)
 Order of Saint Stanislaus (3rd rank - 1839)
 Order of Saint Vladimir (4th rank - 1841)
 Order for the success against the Turks (1877)

References 

1809 births
Azerbaijani nobility
Russian generals
Year of death missing
Recipients of the Order of St. Vladimir, 3rd class
Recipients of the Order of St. Anna, 3rd class
Recipients of the Order of Saint Stanislaus (Russian), 3rd class